Scopula cinnamomata is a moth of the family Geometridae. It is found in the Democratic Republic of the Congo and Uganda. It was described by David Stephen Fletcher in 1955.

References

Moths described in 1955
cinnamomata
Moths of Africa